Jonathan Wells Kruger (born June 4, 1992) is a former American football defensive end. He was drafted by the Philadelphia Eagles in 2013. He played college football at Utah. He is the younger brother of free agent outside linebacker Paul Kruger and free agent defensive end Dave Kruger.

Early years
He attended Pleasant Grove High School in Pleasant Grove, Utah. He was a first-team and all-conference in his senior season. He was ranked among the top 25 defensive end prospects by Rivals.com.

College career
He played college football at Utah. He finished college with  a total of 69 tackles, 9 sacks, 3 forced fumbles and one interception. On January 3, 2013, Kruger announced he would skip his senior season to enter the 2013 NFL Draft.

Professional career

2013 NFL Combine

Philadelphia Eagles
Kruger was selected 6th in the 7th round of the NFL Draft (212 overall) by the Philadelphia Eagles. He was placed on injured reserve on August 30, 2013 and missed the 2013 season. He was released on August 23, 2014.

San Diego Chargers
Kruger was signed by the San Diego Chargers on August 25, 2014. He was released on August 29, 2014.

Green Bay Packers
Kruger was signed to the Green Bay Packers practice squad on October 7, 2014. He was released on November 3, 2014.

Pittsburgh Steelers
Kruger was signed to the Pittsburgh Steelers practice squad on November 24, 2014. He was waived as a part of final roster cuts on September 3, 2015.

Personal
He has two older brothers: New Orleans Saints' defensive end Paul Kruger and free agent defensive end Dave Kruger.

References

External links
San Diego Chargers bio
Utah Utes bio 

1992 births
Living people
Sportspeople from Orem, Utah
Players of American football from Utah
American football defensive ends
American football linebackers
Utah Utes football players
Philadelphia Eagles players